Abitesartan (INN) is an Angiotensin II receptor antagonist.

References

Angiotensin II receptor antagonists
Biphenyls
Carboxamides
Carboxylic acids
Tetrazoles
Cyclopentanes